Mojette may refer to:

Mojette beans, a kind of French beans
Mojette transform, an exact discrete Radon transform